Florian J. Ries (April 30, 1843August 12, 1910) was a German American immigrant, alcohol merchant, and Republican politician.  He served one term in the Wisconsin State Assembly, representing the north side of the city of Milwaukee, and was chief of the Milwaukee Police Department.  He also served as a Union Army volunteer throughout the American Civil War.

Biography
Ries was born on April 30, 1843, in the Grand Duchy of Baden. He was a lieutenant colonel in the Wisconsin State Militia. Following the outbreak of the American Civil War, he enlisted with the 1st Wisconsin Infantry Regiment of the Union Army. He later re-enlisted with the 17th Wisconsin Infantry Regiment, rising to the rank of first lieutenant. Ries was chief of the Milwaukee Police Department from 1885 to 1888.

Political career
Ries was a member of the Wisconsin State Assembly during the 1877 session. He also served as a member of the Milwaukee Common Council and justice of the peace. Ries was a Republican.

References

External links 
The Political Graveyard

People from Baden
Politicians from Milwaukee
Wisconsin city council members
People of Wisconsin in the American Civil War
Union Army officers
Union Army soldiers
National Guard (United States) officers
Chiefs of the Milwaukee Police Department
1843 births
Year of death missing
Republican Party members of the Wisconsin State Assembly